Anthony Gerard "Tony" Lupton (born 10 January 1957), Australian politician, was the Labor Party member for Prahran in the Victorian Legislative Assembly from 2002 to 2010.

Early life

Lupton was born in Melbourne and educated at Christian Brothers College, St Kilda. After leaving school he became an apprentice motor mechanic. In 1978 he returned to school at Caulfield Institute of Technology, successfully completed the Higher School Certificate and gained entrance to an Arts/Law degree course at Monash University.

After graduating he worked as a barrister, specialising in personal injuries cases for injured workers. 
Lupton was elected to the Victorian Parliament at the 2002 state election, when he defeated the sitting Liberal member for Prahran, Leonie Burke.

At the 2006 state election he was elected for a second term  defeating a high-profile Liberal candidate, Clem Newton-Brown. After the election he was appointed Parliamentary Secretary for Industry and Innovation. In August 2007 he was appointed Cabinet Secretary in the new Brumby Labor Government.
 
At the 2010 state election, Newton-Brown returned as the Liberal Party candidate and defeated Lupton with a swing of 7.8%.

Personal life

Following his service in the Victorian Parliament, Lupton was a professorial fellow at Monash University.

He was appointed a sessional member of the Victorian Mental Health Tribunal and the Firearms Appeals Committee in 2016 and in March 2017 was appointed as full-time senior legal member of the Mental Health Tribunal.

He has written widely on historic and classic cars, including a regular column for RoyalAuto magazine until 2017 and articles for Fairfax, Retroautos and other publications. 

Since 2015 he has been secretary of Automotive Historians Australia, a not-for-profit association dedicated to preserving and sharing knowledge about our automotive heritage.

Tony owns a 1967 Ford Mustang, a 1970 MGB GT and a 1974 Alfa Romeo GT Junior. He is a member of the Mustang Owners Club, the MG Car Club, the Alfa Romeo Owners Club and the Victorian Historic Racing Register and enjoys competing in circuit sprints, hillclimbs, motorkhanas and khanacross in his MG.

He is the partner of Julie Szego, journalist and author. Tony and Julie have two daughters.

Lupton is a supporter of the Collingwood Football Club in the Australian Football League.

External links
Tony Lupton's Car Cavalcade Website 

1957 births
Living people
Politicians from Melbourne
Australian Labor Party members of the Parliament of Victoria
Monash Law School alumni
Members of the Victorian Legislative Assembly
21st-century Australian politicians
Automotive historians
Academic staff of Monash University
People educated at St Mary's College, Melbourne